The PMPC Star Award for Best Child Performer is given to the best child performances in a drama series.

Winners

2012: Xyriel Manabat (100 Days to Heaven / ABS-CBN 2)

2013: Andrea Brillantes (Annaliza / ABS-CBN 2)

2014: Raikko Mateo (Honesto / ABS-CBN 2)

2015: Harvey Bautista (Wansapanataym: Remote ni Eric / ABS-CBN 2) & Marco Masa (Nathaniel / ABS-CBN 2) [tied]

2016: McNeal "Awra" Briguela (Ang Probinsyano / ABS-CBN 2)

2017: Nayomi Ramos (My Dear Heart / ABS-CBN 2)

2018: Seth dela Cruz (Hindi Ko Kayang Iwan Ka / GMA 7)

2019: Sophia Reola (Nang Nguniti Ang Langit / ABS-CBN 2)

2020: Enzo Pelojero (Starla / ABS-CBN 2)

Notes:

 Raikko Mateo is the first male winner of this award for Honesto in 2014.
 Seth dela Cruz is the first talent from GMA 7 to win this award for Hindi Ko Kayang Iwan Ka in 2018.

PMPC Star Awards for Television